Olrog may refer to:

People
 Claës Christian Olrog (1912-1985), Swedish-Argentinian zoologist
 Margaret Olrog Stoddart (1865–1934), New Zealand artist
 Peter Olrog Schjøtt (1833–1926), Norwegian philologist and politician
 Ulf Peder Olrog (1919–1972), Swedish folklorist, lecturer, composer, songwriter, and radio personality

Species
 Olrog's chaco mouse
 Olrog's cinclodes
 Olrog's four-eyed opossum
 Olrog's gull